The Milwaukee Bombers is a United States Australian Football League team, based in Milwaukee, Wisconsin, United States. It was founded in 1998. They play in the Mid American Australian Football League.

References

External links
 

Australian rules football clubs in the United States
Sports in Milwaukee
Australian rules football clubs established in 1998
1998 establishments in Wisconsin
Sports teams in Wisconsin